170 Barbigha Assembly constituency is one of 243 legislative assembly constituencies of legislative assembly of Bihar. It is part of Nawada Lok Sabha constituency. It is home constituency of Bihar's first chief minister Shri Krishna Singh.

Overview
Barbigha Constituency comprises CD Blocks Barbigha and Shekhopursarai; Gram Panchayats: Gaway, Audhe, Pain, Lodipur, Kosra, Kusumbha, Kare, Hathiyawan, Mehus & Katari of Sheikhpura CD Block.

Members of Legislative Assembly

Election results

2020

References

External links
 

Politics of Sheikhpura district
Assembly constituencies of Bihar